The Kayalar are Muslim community found in the state of Tamil Nadu in India. They are one of the four major sub-groups that make up the Tamil Muslim community.

See also

 Tamil Muslim
 Labbay

References

Social groups of Tamil Nadu
Muslim communities of India